Football field or football pitch may refer to the playing areas of several codes of football:

 American football field
 Australian rules football playing field
 Canadian football field
 Football pitch, for association football (soccer)
 Gaelic football playing field
 Rugby league playing field
 Rugby union playing field

See also
 Football field (length), an unusual unit of length
 Football field (area), an unusual measure of area